Hawtin is a surname and may refer to:

Craig Hawtin (born 1970), English footballer
David Hawtin (born 1943), the fourth Bishop of Repton from 1999 to 2006
Ian Hawtin (born 1966), English cricketer
Jane Hawtin, Canadian television and radio personality
Melanie Hawtin (born 1988), Canadian 1.5 point wheelchair basketball player
Rawlins Hawtin, English cricketer active from 1902 to 1930
Richie Hawtin (born 1970), English-Canadian electronic musician and DJ
Roger Hawtin, English cricketer active from 1901 to 1908
William Hawtin, English cricketer active from 1929 to 1948